Chloromelas is a genus of flies in the family Stratiomyidae.

Species
Chloromelas barbata Lindner, 1935
Chloromelas brunneipicta James, 1953
Chloromelas coati Lindner, 1951
Chloromelas cordobaensis (Lindner, 1951)
Chloromelas cuprina (Wiedemann, 1830)
Chloromelas virgata Lindner, 1969

References

Stratiomyidae
Brachycera genera
Taxa named by Günther Enderlein
Diptera of South America